Ronny Døhli (born 3 March 1978) is a retired Norwegian football defender.

He went from Strømmen IF's junior team to its senior team in 1995. In 1997 he went on to Skjetten SK, only to get his big break in July 1998 when signed by Vålerenga for the coming season. He got almost 100 league and cup games for Vålerenga and played in the victorious 2002 Norwegian Football Cup Final. He finished his career in Sandefjord and Strømsgodset.

References

1978 births
Living people
People from Skedsmo
Norwegian footballers
Strømmen IF players
Skjetten SK players
Vålerenga Fotball players
Sandefjord Fotball players
Strømsgodset Toppfotball players
Norwegian First Division players
Eliteserien players
Association football defenders
Sportspeople from Viken (county)